Nogaro may refer to:

 Nogaro, a village and commune in the Gers département of south-western France
 Circuit Paul Armagnac, a motorsport race track near Nogaro, also called Nogaro Circuit
 Nogaro Airport (ICAO code: LFCN)
 Žedno (Italian: Nogaro), a village on the island of Čiovo